Silavathurai is a small town in Sri Lanka. It is located within Northern Province.

References

Towns in Mannar District